Genesee Intermediate School District is an Intermediate school district in Michigan serving the school districts that primarily lie within Genesee County.

Schools

Direct schools
Elmer A. Knopf Learning Center
Genesee Career Institute
Genesee Early College
Marion D. Crouse Instructional Center
Mott Middle College

Public school districts
Atherton Community Schools
Beecher Community School District
Bendle Public Schools
Bentley Community Schools
Carman-Ainsworth Community Schools
Clio Area Schools
Davison Community Schools
Fenton Area Public Schools
Flint Community Schools
Flushing Community Schools
Genesee School District
Goodrich Area Schools
Grand Blanc Community Schools
Lake Fenton Community Schools
LakeVille Community Schools
Linden Community Schools
Kearsley Community Schools
Montrose Community Schools
Mount Morris Consolidated Schools
Swartz Creek Community Schools
Westwood Heights Schools

Charter schools
Burton Glen Academy
Center Academy
Genesee STEM Academy
Grand Blanc Academy
Greater Heights Academy
International Academy of Flint 
Linden Charter Academy 
Madison Academy
Northridge Academy
Richfield Public School Academy
The New Standard Academy
WAY Academy Of Flint 
Woodland Park Academy

References

External links
 

Education in Genesee County, Michigan
Intermediate school districts in Michigan